The 2017–18 Ukrainian Football Amateur League season was the 22nd since it replaced the competition of physical culture clubs. The competition started on 5 August 2017.

On 1 August 2017, the AAFU at its website announced the "season's contours". In explanation, AAFU disclosed that it has intention to conduct the competition in three groups that are split based on geographic principle and start it at the end of that week, while the composition of only two groups was confirmed.

Teams
 Debut: FC Mynai, FC Khmelnytskyi, FC Rubikon Kyiv, MFC Metalurh Zaporizhia, FC Yarud Mariupol, FC Druzhba Novomykolaivka
 Newly admitted former professional clubs: FC Krystal Kherson, FC Kalush, FC Pokuttia Kolomyia, SC Kakhovka, FC Hirnyk Kryvyi Rih, FC Olimpik Kropyvnytskyi
 Returning clubs: FC Chernihiv, FC Fakel Lypovets, FC Ahrobiznes TSK Romny

Withdrawn teams
List of clubs that took part in last year competition, but chose not to participate in 2017–18 season:
 FC Kovel-Volyn Kovel
 FC Oskar Pidhiria
 FC Vradiyivka

Location map 
The following displays the location of teams. Group 1 teams marked in red. Group 2 teams marked in green. Group 3 teams marked in blue.

Group stage

Group 1

Notes
 On 7 May 2018, Nyva Terebovlya announced that it withdrew from the competition due to financial issues. The team's record at time of withdrawal was 12 games played, +3=2–7 with goals 16–19.
 On 26 May 2018, FC Khmelnytskyi announced that it won't travel to its scheduled game with FC Mynai.

Group 2

Notes
 Just before the start, there was anticipated participation of FC Zoria-Akademia Biloziria (a farm team of FC Cherkaskyi Dnipro).
 In the winter break, FC Rubikon moved out to Vyshneve, Kyiv Oblast.

Group 3

Notes
 Just before the start, there was anticipated participation of FC Kolos Askania-Nova (former Kolos Khlibodarivka).
 On 19 May 2018, game between SC Kakhovka and Krystal Kherson was interrupted on the 60th minute due to fans violence.
 MFC Metalurh Zaporizhia could not made the play-offs due to worst head-to-head record against Krystal and Tavria-Skif.
Krystal H2H rec: 2–1–1
Tavria-Skif  H2H rec: 1–2–1
Metalurh H2H rec: 1–1–2

Play-off stage
Originally post-season competition structure was acknowledged to be defined by the AAFU Commission in conducting competitions at the end of group stage. On 29 May 2018, AAFU published information about its post-season tournament. According to the information published, the tournament will consist of three stages (quarterfinals, semifinals, and final) and all will consist of a single game. A draw will be conducted to identify semifinal pairs.

Quarterfinals
 Dates: 9, 16, 17 June 2018

|}
Notes:
 Less than a week later after its quarterfinal game, on 15 June 2018 Ahrobiznes TSK Romny announced that it has been dissolved after it was created back in 2014.
 Eliminated in quarterfinals, both FC Minaj and FC Krystal Kherson also admitted 2018–19 Ukrainian Second League by the PFL at the organization's conference on 27 June 2018.

All games details by Artur Valerko on SportArena.

Semifinals
The draw for the round is scheduled to be held on 19 June 2018 in the House of Football, Kyiv. Game date: 24 June 2018.

|}
Notes:

Final
 Date: 29 June 2018

Notes:
 At the end of the game a shoving between players occurred and the referee ejected several players as well as a head coach of Tavria-Skif Maksym Skorokhodov.

See also
 2017–18 Ukrainian Amateur Cup
 2017–18 Ukrainian Second League
 2017–18 Ukrainian First League
 2017–18 Ukrainian Premier League

Notes

References

External links
AAFU
The 2017-18 Season's regulations. AAFU.
Kholodnyi, V. Ukrainian Amateur Championship. In the final will play Viktoriya and Tavria-Skif (Чемпіонат України серед аматорів. У фіналі зіграють "Вікторія" та "Таврія-Скіф"). Footboom. 25 June 2018
Valerko, A. The AAFU Championship: The trophy will be contested between Viktoria and Tavria-Skif (Чемпіонат ААФУ: трофей розіграють Вікторія та Таврія-Скіф). Sport Arena. 25 June 2018

Ukrainian Football Amateur League seasons
4
Uk